Marine Corps Base Camp Smedley D. Butler (or simply Butler Marine Base)
is a United States Marine Corps base located in the Japanese  prefecture of Okinawa. It was named after Marine Corps Major General and twice Medal of Honor recipient Smedley D. Butler.

Installations
Camp Smedley D. Butler is actually a collection of facilities and satellite installations spread throughout Okinawa. Camp Smedley D. Butler was formerly called Camp or Fort Buckner, named for Army General Simon Bolivar Buckner Jr., who commanded ground forces in the invasion of Okinawa and was killed in the last days of the battle. The renaming of Buckner to Butler occurred after most U.S. Army troops left Okinawa, and the base was transferred to the USMC. It is ironic that a foreign military base was named after General Butler as he strongly believed that the military should be limited, by law, to operating within 200 miles of the coastline.

Additionally, Marine Corps Air Station Futenma (including satellite Yomitan Auxiliary Airfield) and Marine Wing Liaison Kadena, while not part of the Camp Butler complex, shares many resources with it. 
Other Marine installations in Japan include Marine Corps Air Station Iwakuni and Camp Fuji.

See also

Okinawa Marine
United States Forces Japan

External links and references

Butler's web site
Camp S D Butler, GlobalSecurity.org

References

Smedley D. Butler
Installations of the U.S. Department of Defense in Japan
United States Armed Forces in Okinawa Prefecture
1955 establishments in Japan